Robot Rabbit is a 1953 Warner Bros. Looney Tunes cartoon directed by Friz Freleng. The short was released on December 12, 1953, and stars Bugs Bunny and Elmer Fudd.

Summary
Elmer Fudd is shown as a carrot farmer who is happily going about his chores singing "In a Little Red Barn (On a Farm down in Indiana)". Halfway through the song, he realizes Bugs has joined his singing. At the end of the chorus of the song, Bugs dives into his hole, and carrots fly into the air. Elmer angrily laments "Ooooh, da wascal wabbit is in my cawwots again!", and then rushes into his house to retrieve a shotgun. After shooting into an empty hole (Bugs had conveniently left the hole, then does his "fake dying" act, culminating in an actual metal bucket that materializes, which Bugs kicks), Elmer exclaims "Howway! Da wabbit kicked da bucket!", then he and Bugs start dancing as a result until Elmer begins to realize Bugs tricked him and is still very much alive.

That prompts Fudd to call "ACME Pest Control": ("Hewwo? ACME Pest Contwol? Weww, I've got a pest I want contwolled.") for a robot with the express purpose of evicting Bugs. After Elmer puts the robot together, The robot initially confuses a mule and Elmer — who was trying to explain to the robot what a rabbit looks like — for his intended target before getting the early upper-hand. Bugs quickly evens the score by luring his antagonist under a rotating water sprinkler, causing the robot to rust. Elmer however resolves this setback just as quickly by oiling the robot up and then warns him that he'll be sold for old scrap iron if he doesn't get the job done.

Later, Bugs disguises himself as a female robot (where he literally throws a wrench into their "relationship"), before finally causing the robot to follow him through a construction site and beneath a pile driver. Back at home, Elmer starts wondering how the robot fared, Bugs greets him and dumps the remains of the robot onto the floor; it proved that the robot was crushed underneath the pile driver. As Bugs walks off, he comments to himself: "Ya know, someday, dese scientists are gonna invent something dat will outsmart a rabbit".

Additional Crew
 Film Edited by Treg Brown
 Uncredited Orchestration by Milt Franklyn

Notes
The line where Elmer called the company about pest control was somewhat reused in the 1965 cartoon, It's Nice to Have a Mouse Around the House.

The same robot was used by Sylvester hunting Speedy Gonzales in a 1964 cartoon, Nuts and Volts. The scene where the lower half of its body fell apart and parts fell out of its sockets like a person accidentally dropping its pants was also reused.

A scene mentioned about Bugs Bunny calling the robot "a fugitive from a Stanley Steamer". Stanley Steamer is the colloquial name for products of the Stanley Motor Carriage Company, which produced steam-powered automobiles from 1902 to 1924.

There's also a scene where the robot dug the hole where Bugs was hiding and sifted out its quarry. It was reused from an earlier cartoon, Rabbit Every Monday.

Errors
When Bugs is speaking to the audience while running away from the robot, his mouth doesn't move.

References

External links
 

1953 films
1953 animated films
1953 short films
Short films directed by Friz Freleng
Looney Tunes shorts
Warner Bros. Cartoons animated short films
Films scored by Carl Stalling
Animated films about robots
Bugs Bunny films
Elmer Fudd films
1950s Warner Bros. animated short films
1950s English-language films